William Towers is an English countertenor. Towers was a choral scholar at Cambridge University, where he read English.  He subsequently studied at the Royal Academy of Music.

In 2000 he was a soloist in the Monteverdi Choir's Bach Cantata Pilgrimage, performances which have been released on CD (some on Archiv and others on SDG).  He has since appeared in concerts and in operatic productions. His repertoire in opera includes Baroque works and more modern operas such as those of Britten.

References

Operatic countertenors
21st-century British male opera singers
Living people
Year of birth missing (living people)
Place of birth missing (living people)
Alumni of the University of Cambridge
Alumni of the Royal Academy of Music